Pasquale Ricca (Civezza, 1854-1910) was an Italian painter and sculptor, with an eclectic output of portraits, genre, still-life, seascape, and landscape subjects.

Ricca studied in Florence, and worked for a time in Rome and Nizza, but lived most of his adult life in Porto Maurizio in Liguria.<ref>[http://www.comune.imperia.it/node/647  Una Riviera Invisible: :L'Arte di Pasquale Ricca] , Exhibition at Imperia, Italy.</ref> Ricca did a large amount of his work based in the Ligurian Riviera.  In 1883 at the National Exhibition of Fine Arts of Rome, he exhibited Passeggiata and Nevicata; in 1884 at Turin, he sent, Acquasantiera di San Pietro at Rome  and Tralci con uva''.

In 1902, Pasquale Ricca was introduced into public service when he was appointed Conservator of Monuments and Objects of Art and Antiquities for Porto Maurizio.

References

19th-century Italian painters
Italian male painters
20th-century Italian painters
1854 births
1910 deaths
Italian still life painters
Italian genre painters
Italian landscape painters
19th-century Italian male artists
20th-century Italian male artists